Mian Muhammad Latif is a Pakistani businessman who is the founder of Chenab Group. He is the father of Pakistani politician Mian Farhan Latif.

Early life and career
Mian Muhammad Latif was born in 1952 in Toba Tek Singh to an Arain family. His father Haji Muhammad Saleem was a cotton industrialist and an entrepreneur. He later moved to Faisalabad for studies and after graduating in 1974, he started textile business by setting up a small processing unit that has, over the years, become one of the largest vertically integrated textile group of Pakistan known as Chenab Group. This business group's industrial units are involved in cotton yarn spinning, fabric weaving as well as fabric stitching processes. Chenab Group processes 50 million square meters of weaved fabric and 75 million square meters of dyed fabric every year. It has established a global sales network in all the continents of the world. This group is mainly engaged in manufacture and distribution of clothing, furniture, household quilts and curtains.

In 1997, Mian Latif introduced the concept of ChenOne retail stores in Pakistan which was the first direct retail outlet concept for a large manufacturer in Pakistan. The venture turned out to be successful and today has a good reputation and is a well-known brand inside and outside Pakistan.

Awards and recognition
Mian Latif was awarded with Tamgha-e-Imtiaz civil award (Medal of Excellence) by President Pervez Musharraf, on 23 March 2004, for his services to the industry. He had been a close friend of many Pakistani politicians including Benazir Bhutto, Pervez Musharraf, Shaukat Aziz and Yousaf Raza Gillani. His younger brother Chaudhry Muhammad Ashfaq is an ex-MNA (Member of National Assembly or Parliament) and a former 'District Nazim' of Toba Tek Singh. His son Mian Farhan Latif was the youngest MNA during PML-Q (Pakistan Muslim League party) tenure of 2002-2008. He had also been awarded the 'Businessman of the Year Gold Medal' by the Federation of Pakistan Chambers of Commerce & Industry (FPCCI) for investment, industry and trade consecutively during the years 1998 to 2002.

References

External links
http://www.chenabgroup.com/ Chenab Group official website
http://www.chenone.com.pk/ Chen One official website

1952 births
Living people
Pakistani chief executives
Pakistani industrialists
Recipients of Tamgha-e-Imtiaz
People from Faisalabad
People from Toba Tek Singh District
Punjabi people
Pakistani company founders